Arvin is a city in Kern County, California. As of the 2010 census, the population was 19,304, up from 12,956 at the 2000 census.

In 2007, the United States Environmental Protection Agency (EPA) listed Arvin as having the highest levels of smog of any community in the United States.  The city's level of ozone, smog's primary component, exceeded the EPA's acceptable limits on an average of 73 days per year between 2004 and 2006.

Wired telephone numbers in Arvin follow the format (661) 854-xxxx or (661) 855-xxxx and the ZIP Code is 93203.

History
Property sales of lots in present-day Arvin began in 1906. The Arvin Post Office was established in 1914 and the community incorporated as a city in 1960. The city was named after Arvin Richardson, who was the son of one of the original settling families from San Bernardino. Birdie Heard petitioned for the addition of the post office in 1914 and submitted proposed names, including Bear Mountain, Walnut, and Arvin.  Officials in Washington, D.C., chose Arvin as it was the only proposed name which was not already in use in California. Birdie was the city's first postmaster. She initially set up the post office in her living room, but it was later moved to the general store owned by the Staples family. The in-store post office was also the area's first informal library until an official branch of the Kern County Library system was established in 1927.

Pedro Subia, a Mexican striker in the California agricultural strikes of 1933, was murdered at a strike in Arvin.

The Mountain View Oil Field, which underlies the town and much of the surrounding area, was discovered in 1933 and developed extensively in the 1930s. Many oil wells still surround the town; some are slant-drilled to reach formations directly underneath inhabited areas.

In the 1930s and 1940s the area east of Arvin became popular for recreational gliding and soaring, and the hillsides of the Tejon Ranch were used annually for a Western Soaring Championship in the spring. These significant events were later memorialized as a National Landmark of Soaring by the National Soaring Museum in 2000.

The Arvin Tiller started publication in 1939 and Arvin High School was built in 1949. The city was nearly destroyed on July 21, 1952, during the M7.3 Kern County earthquake (a rupture of the White Wolf Fault). Arvin suffered further damage on December 20, 1977, when a dust storm hit the area.

The Arvin Migratory Labor Camp was the first federally operated farm labor camp opened by the Farm Security Administration in 1937, one of many New Deal programs created during the presidency of Franklin D. Roosevelt to respond to the Great Depression. This agricultural camp was considered a model, and was built by the Resettlement Administration.

Geography

Climate
According to the Köppen Climate Classification system, Arvin has a semi-arid climate, abbreviated "BSk" on climate maps.

Demographics

2010
At the 2010 census Arvin had a population of 19,304. The racial makeup of Arvin was 10,247 (53.1%) White, 192 (1.0%) African American, 240 (1.2%) Native American, 155 (0.8%) Asian, 6 (0.0%) Pacific Islander, 7,655 (39.7%) from other races, and 809 (4.2%) from two or more races. Hispanic or Latino of any race were 17,892 persons (92.7%).

The census reported that 18,955 people (98.2% of the population) lived in households, 281 (1.5%) lived in non-institutionalized group quarters, and 68 (0.4%) were institutionalized.

There were 4,228 households, 3,024 (71.5%) had children under the age of 18 living in them, 2,803 (66.3%) were opposite-sex married couples living together, 646 (15.3%) had a female householder with no husband present, 355 (8.4%) had a male householder with no wife present. There were 291 (6.9%) unmarried opposite-sex partnerships, and 24 (0.6%) same-sex married couples or partnerships. 303 households (7.2%) were one person and 125 (3.0%) had someone living alone who was 65 or older. The average household size was 4.48. There were 3,804 families (90.0% of households); the average family size was 4.59.

The age distribution was 7,422 people (38.4%) under the age of 18, 2,539 people (13.2%) aged 18 to 24, 5,399 people (28.0%) aged 25 to 44, 2,958 people (15.3%) aged 45 to 64, and 986 people (5.1%) who were 65 or older. The median age was 24.0 years. For every 100 females, there were 108.2 males.  For every 100 females age 18 and over, there were 109.5 males.

There were 4,476 housing units at an average density of 928.8 per square mile, of the occupied units 2,261 (53.5%) were owner-occupied and 1,967 (46.5%) were rented. The homeowner vacancy rate was 2.5%; the rental vacancy rate was 4.8%. 10,487 people (54.3% of the population) lived in owner-occupied housing units and 8,468 people (43.9%) lived in rental housing units.

2000
As of the census of 2000, there were 12,956 people in 3,010 households, including 2,645 families, in the city. The racial makeup of the city was 45.04% White, 1.08% Black or African American, 1.46% Native American, 1.10% Asian, 0.12% Pacific Islander, 46.55% from other races, and 4.65% from two or more races. 87.53% of the population were Hispanic or Latino of any race.

Of the 3,010 households 63.2% had children under the age of 18 living with them, 67.7% were married couples living together, 13.7% had a female householder with no husband present, and 12.1% were non-families. 9.5% of households were one person and 5.4% were one person aged 65 or older. The average household size was 4.28 and the average family size was 4.51.

The age distribution was 40.0% under the age of 18, 12.8% from 18 to 24, 28.8% from 25 to 44, 12.5% from 45 to 64, and 5.8% 65 or older. The median age was 23 years. For every 100 females, there were 111.0 males. For every 100 females age 18 and over, there were 108.3 males.

The median income for a household in the city was $23,674, and the median family income  was $24,816. Males had a median income of $20,506 versus $17,684 for females. The per capita income for the city was $7,408. About 30.9% of families and 32.6% of the population were below the poverty line, including 37.6% of those under age 18 and 23.1% of those age 65 or over.

Economy
The economy of Arvin is primarily based on agriculture, and as such the employment statistics show seasonal variation. In March 2011, 41.9 percent of Arvin's residents were out of work, the highest of any city in Kern County.

Cannabis

In 2018, voters in Arvin passed a measure to license and tax marijuana after the legalization of the sale and distribution of cannabis in California was legalized. The measure set a 6% tax on cannabis sales and a tax of up to $6 per square foot per year on cultivation. The city issued its first license to a delivery service in June 2020. This was the first legal cannabis business in Kern County as similar measures have failed in other jurisdictions. Companies must be licensed by the local agency and the state to grow, test, or sell cannabis and each city or county may authorize none or only some of these activities. Local governments may not prohibit adults who are in compliance with state laws from growing, using, or transporting marijuana for personal use.

Education

The city of Arvin is served by the Arvin Union School District and the Kern High School District.  Other nearby districts include Di Giorgio School District, Vineland School District, and the Lamont School District.

The Arvin Union School District consists of Sierra Vista Elementary School, Bear Mountain Elementary School, El Camino Real Elementary School, Haven Drive Middle School, and Arvin State Preschool. The land for the Haven Drive campus was acquired in 1943. Sierra Vista and Haven Drive are the two oldest schools in Arvin.  The district serves preschool to eighth grade students. The Arvin Union School District also serves the community with the Arvin Family Resource Center.

The Kern High School District serves grades 9–12 in Arvin. It operates Arvin High School, which also services students from the surrounding rural areas and the nearby town of Lamont.

Public safety

The city of Arvin has its own police department. In January 2008, the city purchased six hybrid police vehicles with a grant by the San Joaquin Valley Air Pollution Control District. The city also purchased six hybrid SUVs in December 2008 with a grant by the San Joaquin Valley Air Quality District.  Station 54 of the Kern County Fire Department is responsible for fire prevention services.

Crime statistics
2010

Population: 15,410
Violent crime: 187
Murder and non-negligent manslaughter: 10
Forcible rape: 1
Robbery: 19
Aggravated assault: 167
Property crime: 500
Burglary: 186
Larceny: 232
Motor vehicle theft: 82
Arson: 14

Full-time law enforcement employees
2010

Population: 15,410
Total law enforcement employees: 27
Total Officers: 18
Total Civilians: 9

References

Further reading
Bailey, Richard C., Kern County Place Names, (Bakersfield, California: Merchant's Printing and Lithography Co., 1967).

External links

Arvin Chamber of Commerce
NPR - California Town a Magnet for Smog

1960 establishments in California
Cities in Kern County, California
Incorporated cities and towns in California
Populated places established in 1907
Populated places established in 1960
San Joaquin Valley
Chicano and Mexican neighborhoods in California